The Table Mountain Aerial Cableway is a cable car transportation system offering visitors a five-minute ride to the top of Table Mountain in Cape Town, South Africa. It is one of Cape Town's most popular tourist attractions with approximately one million people a year using the Cableway. In January 2019,  the Cableway welcomed its 28 millionth visitor.

The upper cable station offers views over Cape Town, Table Bay and Robben Island to the north, and the Atlantic seaboard to the west and south. Amenities at the upper station include free guided walking tours, an audio tour, meal options at a café and a wi-fi lounge.

History

By the 1870s, Capetonians had proposed a railway to the top of Table Mountain, but plans were halted by the Anglo-Boer War. The City Council began investigating the options again in 1912, but this was in turn halted by the First World War.  Despite initial cost estimates of £100,000 (equivalent to £38,800,000 in 2011 pounds) to build the cableway the city's population was supportive of the project and in a referendum overwhelmingly voted in support of the project.

A Norwegian engineer, Trygve Stromsoe, presented plans for a cableway in 1926, and construction began soon after with the formation of the Table Mountain Aerial Cableway Company (TMACC). Former world leading wire ropeway company Adolf Bleichert & Co. from Leipzig (Germany) was awarded the contract for the construction. It was completed in 1929 at a cost of £60,000 (equivalent to £11,400,000 in 2011 pounds) and the cableway was opened on 4 October 1929, by the Mayor of Cape Town AJS Lewis. The cableway has been upgraded three times since then.  Sir David Graaff, a leading industrialist, former mayor of Cape Town and government minister, also invested heavily in the project.

In 1993, the son of one of the founders sold the TMACC and the new owners took charge of upgrading the cableway. In 1997, the cableway was reopened after extensive renovations, and new cars were introduced.

Specifications
The "Rotair" cableway was installed by Garaventa (Doppelmayr Garaventa Group) from Switzerland in 1997, the design being based on the Titlis Rotair cableway in Engelberg, Switzerland.
Each car carries 65 passengers (compared to 25 for the old cars), and runs on a double cable making them more stable in high winds, giving a faster journey of 4–5 minutes to the summit. The floors of the cars rotate through 360 degrees during the ascent or descent, giving passengers a panoramic view.

Gallery

References

External links

 Table Mountain Aerial Cableway
 Lower Cable station - Construction photos Collection

Buildings and structures completed in 1929
Aerial tramways in South Africa
Transport in Cape Town
Table Mountain
Tourist attractions in Cape Town
1929 establishments in South Africa